Louie Shaun Watson (born 7 June 2001) is a professional footballer who plays as a midfielder for EFL Championship club Luton Town.

Club career
Watson made his debut for Derby County as a substitute in a 4–0 win against Birmingham City on 29 December 2020.

On 1 July 2022, Watson joined Championship club Luton Town for an undisclosed fee.

International career
Watson attended an U15 training camp with England, before playing for the Republic of Ireland at U18 level. On March 26, 2021, Watson made his Ireland U21s debut playing 73 minutes in a 2-1 away win over Wales U21s.

Career statistics

References

2001 births
Living people
Footballers from Croydon
English people of Irish descent
English footballers
Republic of Ireland association footballers
Association football midfielders
West Ham United F.C. players
Derby County F.C. players
Luton Town F.C. players
English Football League players
England youth international footballers
Republic of Ireland youth international footballers